Depression glass is glassware made in the period 1929–1939, often clear or colored translucent machine-made glassware that was distributed free, or at low cost, in the United States and Canada around the time of the Great Depression.  Depression glass is so called because collectors generally associate mass-produced glassware in pink, yellow, crystal, green, and blue with the Great Depression in America.

History
The Quaker Oats Company, and other food manufacturers and distributors, put a piece of glassware in boxes of food, as an incentive to purchase. Some movie theaters and businesses handed out pieces to patrons.

Most of this glassware was made in the Ohio River Valley of the United States, where access to raw materials and power made manufacturing inexpensive in the first half of the twentieth century. More than twenty manufacturers made more than 100 patterns, and entire dinner sets were made in some patterns. Common colors are clear (crystal), pink, pale blue, green, and amber. Less common colors include yellow (canary), ultramarine, jadeite (opaque pale green), delphite (opaque pale blue), cobalt blue, red (ruby and royal ruby), black, amethyst, monax, and white (milk glass). Some depression glass is uranium glass. 

Although of marginal quality, Depression glass has been highly collectible since the 1960s. Due to its popularity as a collectible, it is becoming more scarce on the open market. Rare pieces may sell for several hundred dollars. Some manufacturers continued to make popular patterns after World War II, or introduced similar patterns, which are also collectible. Popular and expensive patterns and pieces have been reproduced, and reproductions are still being made.

Manufacturers and patterns

Anchor Hocking Glass Company
Forest Green
Manhattan
Oyster and Pearl
Queen Mary
Royal Ruby
Teardrop and Dot
Belmont Tumbler Company
Bowknot
Rose Cameo
Dell Glass Company
Tulip
Diamond Glass-Ware Company
Victory
Economy
Round Robin
Federal Glass Company
Colonial Fluted
Columbia
Diana
Georgian
Madrid
Mayfair
Normandie
Optic Paneled
Parrot
Patrician
Raindrops
Rosemary
Sharon
Twisted Optic
Fry Glass
Hazel-Atlas Glass Company
Aurora
Beehive
Cloverleaf
Colony
Colonial Block
Crisscross
Florentine No.1
Florentine No.2
Fruits
Moderntone
New Century
Newport
Ovide
Ribbon
Roxana
Royal Lace
Ships
Starlight
Wagon Wheel
Hocking Glass Company
Ballerina
Block Optic
Circle
Colonial
Coronation
Fire-King dinnerware
Philbe
Fortune
Hobnail
Lake Como
Mayfair
Miss America
Old Cafe
Old Colony
Princess
Ring
Roulette
Spiral
Vitrock
Waterford
Imperial Glass Company
Beaded Block
Diamond Quilted
Laced Edge
Little Jewel
Molly
Twisted Optic
Indiana Glass Company
Avocado
Cracked Ice
Indiana Custard
Lorain
No.610, Pyramid
No.612, Horseshoe
No.616, Vernon
No.618, Pineapple and Floral
Old English
Park Lane
Sandwich
Tea Room
Jeannette Glass Company
Adam
Cherry Blossom
Cube
Doric
Doric and Pansy
Floral
Hex Optic
Homespun
Iris
Sierra
Sunburst
Sunflower
Swirl
Windsor
Jenkins
Ocean Wave
Lancaster Glass Company
Jubilee
Landrum
Patrick
Liberty Works
American Pioneer
MacBeth-Evans Glass Company
American Sweetheart
Chinex Classic
Cremax
Dogwood
Petalware
S Pattern
Thistle
McKee Glass Company
Laurel
Rock Crystal
Paden City Glass Company
Cupid
Gothic Garden
Orchid
Peacock and Wild Rose
Peacock Reverse
L. E. Smith Glass Company
By Cracky
Mt. Pleasante
Pebbled Rim
Romanesque
U.S. Glass Company
Aunt Polly
Cherryberry
Floral and Diamond Band
Flower Garden with Butterflies
Primo
Strawberry
Swirl
Westmoreland Glass Company
Della Robbia
English Hobnail
Woolworth

Elegant glass

A prominent sub-category of Depression Glass, Elegant glass, is of considerably better quality, often including polished mold seams, and hand-decoration such as cut patterns, etched patterns, and painted patterns. It was distributed through jewelry and department stores from the 1920s and continuing after the Great Depression through the 1950s, and was an alternative to fine china. Most of the Elegant glassware manufacturers had closed by the end of the 1950s, when cheap glassware and imported china replaced Elegant glass. 

Some Elegant glass manufacturers were:
Cambridge Glass Company
Consolidated Lamp and Glass Company
Duncan Miller Glass Company
Fenton Art Glass Company
Fostoria Glass Company
Heisey Glass Company
Imperial Glass Company
Lotus Glass Company
McKee Glass Company
Morgantown Glass Works
New Martinsville Glass Company
Paden City Glass Company
Tiffin Glass Company
Westmoreland Glass Company

See also

Burmese glass
Carnival glass
Elegant glass
Fiesta (dinnerware)
Goofus glass
Hazel-Atlas Glass Company
Milk glass
Pressed glass
Satin glass
Sencer Sari
Uranium glass
Uranium tile

References

External links

National Depression Glass Association
Consolidated Lamp & Glass Co History

Depression glass identification:
 ChatAboutDG Glass Pattern Database
 Maker Marks by David Doty's Carnival Glass website
  Many Indiana Glass Patterns by Carnival Heaven
 Glass Company Histories, Glass Patterns/Colors/Definitions
 Brief summary on Depression glass

Collecting
Great Depression
History of glass
Retro style
Nostalgia in the United States
Glass types